The 2014 I-League 2nd Division was the seventh season of the I-League 2nd Division under its current title. The season began on 7 February 2014. It contained 11 clubs in two groups and twelfth club United Sikkim F.C. directly entered into final round. Royal Wahingdoh F.C. won the tournament and will be promoted to 2014–15 I-League.

Team overview

Teams and locations

Group stage

Group A
Matches to be played in Railway Stadium, Dhanbad

Group B
Matches to be played in Paljor Stadium, Gangtok

Final round

References

External links
Season at soccerway.com

I-League 2nd Division seasons
2
India